Frolick is a surname. Notable people with the surname include:

Billy Frolick (born 1959), American writer and director
Cedric Frolick (born 1967), South African politician

See also
Frolic (disambiguation)
Frolík